General Thompson may refer to:

Charles F. Thompson (1882–1954), U.S. Army major general
David D. Thompson (born 1963), U.S. Space Force general
Edmund R. Thompson (1930–2019), U.S. Army major general
Geoffrey Thompson (British Army officer) (1905–1983), British Army lieutenant general
James E. Thompson Jr. (1935–2017), U.S. Army lieutenant general
John F. Thompson (general) (fl. 1980s–2020s), U.S. Air Force lieutenant general
John T. Thompson (1860–1940), U.S. Army brigadier general
Julian Thompson (Royal Marines officer) (born 1934), Royal Marines major general
M. Jeff Thompson (1826–1876), Missouri State Guard brigadier general
Michael C. Thompson (fl. 1980s–2020s), Oklahoma Army National Guard major general
Richard Horner Thompson (1926–2016), U.S. Army general
Thomas Perronet Thompson (1783–1869), British Army major general
Tracy A. Thompson (fl. 1980s–2020s), U.S. Army Reserve major general 
Waddy Thompson Jr. (1798–1868), South Carolina Militia brigadier general
William Thompson (Iowa politician) (1813–1897), Iowa Volunteer Cavalry brevet brigadier general
William Thompson (general) (1736–1781), Continental Army brigadier general

See also
General Thomson (disambiguation)
Attorney General Thompson (disambiguation)